The Suciu is a left tributary of the river Lăpuș in Maramureș County, Romania. It discharges into the Lăpuș in Dămăcușeni. The section upstream from the confluence with the Brad is also referred to as Minget.

Tributaries

The following rivers are tributaries to the river Suciu:

Left: Brad, Strâmba, Larga, Periac, Lupoaia
Right: Valea lui Saleu

References

Rivers of Romania
Rivers of Maramureș County